Pyncostola pentacentra is a moth of the family Gelechiidae. It was described by Edward Meyrick in 1912. It is found in South Africa, where it has been recorded from KwaZulu-Natal.

The wingspan is about 20 mm. The forewings are whitish ochreous and the costa is slightly sprinkled with brownish specks. There are conspicuous black dots beneath the costa at one-sixth and one-third. The stigmata are black, the plical obliquely before the first discal. The hindwings are ochreous whitish.

References

Endemic moths of South Africa
Moths described in 1912
Pyncostola